Irene Silverblatt is a professor of cultural anthropology at Duke University. Her work revolves mainly around race and religion in Peru during the Spanish Inquisition.  Silverblatt earned her PhD at the University of Michigan. 

Silverblatt studies the intersection of the categories of race and religion, and how colonial categories based on them affect the contemporary world.  She is a leading scholar in Peruvian late modern history and the effects of religion and race in Spanish South America.

Articles
"Stained Blood in the Old World and the New: New Christians and the Racial Categories of the Colonial-Modern World." Edited by AE Glauz-Todrank. Critical Research on Religion 2 (2014).
"Heresies and colonial geopolitics." Romanic Review 103, no. 1-2 (January 1, 2012): 65-80
"Confronting Nationalisms, Cosmopolitan Visions, and the Politics of Memory: Aesthetics of Reconciliation and Selma Meerbaum-Eisinger in Western Ukraine (Accepted)." Dissidences 4, no. 8 (2012).
 "Chasteté et pureté des liens sociaux dans le Pérou du XVIIe siècle." Cahiers du Genre 50, no. 1 (December 1, 2011): 17-40.
"Colonial Peru and the Inquisition: Race-Thinking, Torture, and the Making of the Modern World." Transforming Anthropology 19, no. 2 (October 2011): 132-138.
"Colonial conspiracies." ETHNOHISTORY 53, no. 2 (2006): 259-280.

Books
“New Christians and New World Fears in Seventeenth-Century Peru“
Modern Inquisitions: Peru and the Colonial Origins of the Civilized World
Moon, Sun, and Witches: Gender Ideologies and Class in Inca and Colonial Peru

Editing and translation

Japanese and Spanish translation of Moon, Sun, and Witches

References

Cultural anthropologists
Duke University faculty
Living people
Year of birth missing (living people)